Torellia is a genus of small sea snails, marine gastropod mollusks in the family Capulidae, the cap snails.

Species
Species within the genus Torellia include:

 Torellia antarctica (Thiele, 1912)
 Torellia cornea Powell, 1951
 Torellia delicata (Philippi, 1844)
 Torellia didyma Bouchet & Warén, 1993
 Torellia exilis (Powell, 1958)
 Torellia insignis (Smith, 1915)
 Torellia mirabilis (Smith, 1907)
 Torellia planispira (Smith, 1915)
 Torellia smithi Waren, Arnaud & Cantera, 1986

References

External links

Capulidae
Gastropod genera